Adventuress is a  gaff-rigged schooner launched in 1913 in East Boothbay, Maine. She has since been restored, and is listed as a National Historic Landmark.  She is one of two surviving San Francisco bar pilot schooners.

Adventuress is currently operated by Sound Experience, a non-profit organization based in Port Townsend, Washington.

History 

Adventuress was built for John Borden at the Rice Brothers' yard in East Boothbay, Maine, and was designed by B.B. Crowninshield. Borden intended to sail to Alaska to catch a bowhead whale for the American Museum of Natural History in New York. Aboard this maiden voyage sailed the famed naturalist Roy Chapman Andrews. During the voyage, Chapman stopped on the Pribilof Islands and captured film of fur seals, which led to efforts to protect their colonies. Borden's efforts to catch a whale failed and he sold Adventuress to the San Francisco Bar Pilots Association, which marked the beginning of her career as a workboat. For 35 years, she transferred pilots to and from cargo vessels near the Farallon Islands. During World War II, she was a United States Coast Guard vessel, guarding San Francisco Bay.
[[Image:Dinghy.jpg|left|thumb|Adventuress''' dinghy A-ya-she]]

Around 1952, Adventuress was brought to Seattle, where she went through several owners. Eventually, she wound up in the care of Monty Morton and Ernestine Bennett, who managed a non-profit sail training organization called Youth Adventure. Under their ownership, the boat was restored to most of her original lines, which had been altered during her years as a working vessel. In 1988, Sound Experience began conducting educational programs on the vessel, and the following year she was listed as a National Historic Landmark. and

 Sound Experience 

Today Adventuress'' is operated by the non-profit organization Sound Experience, as a platform for environmental education about Puget Sound. She sails from March into October, on trips ranging from 3 hours to 7 days. Paid employees and volunteers perform office, crew, and maintenance work.

See also 

 Historic preservation
 National Historic Landmark
 Adventuress (dinghy)
 List of schooners

References

External links 

 Sound Experience
 Adventuress Facebook Page
 Adventuress Twitter Page
 Adventuress Youtube Channel
 Adventuress Blog
 Adventuress Flickr Group
 Sound Experience LinkedIn Profile

Schooners of the United States
Museum ships in Washington (state)
National Historic Landmarks in Washington (state)
National Register of Historic Places in Port Townsend, Washington
Ships of the United States Coast Guard
Ships on the National Register of Historic Places in Washington (state)
Ships built in Boothbay, Maine
1913 ships
Museums in Jefferson County, Washington
Sail training ships